Saint-Avit is a commune in the Drôme department in southeastern France.
Saint-Avit was detached from the municipality of Ratières on November 15, 1869 and is located 17 km east of Saint-Vallier (capital of the canton) and 10 km north of Saint-Donat-sur-l'Herbasse.

The surrounding communities are Ratières, Saint-Martin-d'Août, Bathernay, Châteauneuf-de-Galaure, Mureils and Claveyson.

Population

See also
Communes of the Drôme department

References

Communes of Drôme